Big Brother is an American television reality competition show based on the original Dutch reality show of the same name created by producer John de Mol in 1997. The series takes its name from the character in George Orwell's 1949 novel Nineteen Eighty-Four. The American series launched on July 5, 2000 on CBS and is currently the second longest-running adaptation in the Big Brother franchise to date, after the Spanish version.

The show broadly follows the premise of other versions of the format, in which a group of contestants, known as "HouseGuests", live together in a specially constructed house that is isolated from the outside world for a cash prize of $500,000 (or $750,000 in the 23rd season onwards). The HouseGuests are continuously monitored during their stay in the house by live television cameras as well as personal audio microphones. Throughout the course of the competition, HouseGuests are evicted from the house, by being voted out of the competition. In its inaugural season (which followed the original Dutch format), ratings declined and critical reaction grew increasingly negative, prompting the series to be revamped for the second season, which focused on competition and gameplay.

A twenty-fourth season of the series premiered on July 6, 2022. On September 25, 2022, CBS renewed the series for a twenty-fifth season.

The show also produced two spin-offs: Big Brother: Over the Top, which aired for one season and was the first reality game show to air exclusively on a streaming platform airing in Fall 2016 on CBS' streaming service, CBS All Access (now Paramount+); and Celebrity Big Brother, which aired on CBS in February 2018.

History

Series

The series was bought by CBS in early 2000 for an estimated $20 million. The American version of the series officially premiered on July 5, 2000, when the original ten housemates entered the house. Since its inception, the show has been hosted by television personality Julie Chen Moonves. It is produced by Allison Grodner and Rich Meehan for Fly on the Wall Entertainment and Endemol Shine North America (formerly Endemol USA). The success of the series has spawned several spin-offs. The series airs once a year, during the summer, except for the ninth season, which aired in the spring of 2008, and the Over the Top spinoff series broadcasting in fall 2016. Currently, 24 seasons of the show have aired, along with one digital season. Season 22 premiered on August 5, 2020. The show has aired a total of 855 episodes  since it premiered, with the September 5, 2013 airing marking the 500th episode. To date, there have been a total of 304 HouseGuests compete in the series. Upon entering the house, the HouseGuests must abide by the house rules; HouseGuests can anytime leave the house without permission or be forcibly removed from the game if they broke any rules, such as exhibiting violent and disruptive behavior. In both cases, these HouseGuests are not allowed to return to the house and are usually incorporated with a penalty such as not allowed to be involved in a jury.

In an effort to promote diversity, CBS announced a new rule for Big Brother that 50% of all contestants must be a person of color or an indigenous person for the 2021–2022 broadcast season.

Companion shows
Since its premiere, there have been numerous companion programs about the show. In 2004, the web series House Calls: The Big Brother Talk Show (2004–2008) began airing. The series, which lasted for thirty minutes and aired on weeknights, allowed fans to call in and discuss the events of the game. This made House Calls the first live Internet talk show produced exclusively for a television network. The series was initially hosted by Gretchen Massey and Big Brother 3 HouseGuest Marcellas Reynolds during its first two seasons. Beginning with the show's third season, a new co-host was featured on the series each day, with some returning more than once. During the show's fifth and sixth seasons, each co-host was given a designated day of the week to host alongside Gretchen. Following the show's sixth season, it was confirmed that it would not be renewed. Big Brother: After Dark, a second companion series, was debuted in 2007 and aired on Showtime Too nightly from 12:00 midnight-3:00am Eastern Time. The series continued this schedule until 2013, at which point it was moved to TVGN (now Pop), where it remains today. Former HouseGuest Jeff Schroeder began hosting the Big Brother: Live Chat online discussion show in 2012, where he interviewed the HouseGuests both before they enter the house and following their evictions. He also performed post-finale backyard interviews with the cast. On August 10, 2017, Schroeder announced that he was moving to Colorado and would no longer be able to do the interviews. For Big Brother 20, the "Live Chat" was replaced by Off the Block with Ross and Marissa. Hosted by former Celebrity HouseGuests Marissa Jaret Winokur and Ross Mathews, the show is set to air on Fridays on Facebook following the live eviction.

Spin-offs

There have been two spin-off editions of Big Brother. In October 2016, CBS premiered a spin-off web series, Big Brother: Over the Top, as an original series for CBS All Access. Unlike the flagship, television version, it was broadcast exclusively online with a shorter, 10-week season. The second spin-off, Celebrity Big Brother, aired its first season on CBS on February 7, 2018. Celebrity Big Brother was renewed for a second season, which premiered on January 21, 2019 and concluded on February 13. However, on January 1, 2020, CBS announced there would not be a Celebrity Big Brother in 2020. In September 2021, CBS announced that the celebrity edition of the show would be returning on February 2, 2022.

Though not an actual spin-off, the Canadian edition of the series is, to date, the only series to adopt the full American format of Big Brother. However, other franchises have used elements of the American format, including the 2020 revival of the Big Brother Australia, which uses an altered version of the American format with the Australian public still deciding the eventual winner. Other franchises such as Big Brother Brasil soon adopted individual elements from the American format (Veto Competition, Have/Have-Nots, and Head of Household) into their format while still maintaining the international public vote format for weekly evictions and final vote.

Format
Big Brother is a reality game show in which a group of contestants, referred to as HouseGuests, live in a custom-built "house" (actually a set built on a CBS stage in Los Angeles, Stage 18 since season six), constantly under video surveillance. While in the house, the contestants are completely isolated from the outside world, meaning that they are not allowed any contact with those not in the house. This rule could be broken, however, in the event of a medical injury, a family emergency or death. The format of the series is mainly seen as a social experiment, and requires HouseGuests to interact with others who may have differing ideals, beliefs, and prejudices. While a competition, the series allows viewers to witness the relationships formed in the house and the behavior of the HouseGuests. Though locked in the house, the HouseGuests are free to quit the game, though they will not be allowed entry back into the house. Should a HouseGuest break the rules of the game, they could be expelled from the house and unable to return. The contestants compete for a grand prize of $500,000 (or $750,000 starting in the 23rd season).

Season 1
The premiere season, the format of the show resembled the original Dutch version of the show—a format adapted by most versions. As the format of the show emphasized the social experiment aspects of the premise, the competitive aspects were minimized: HouseGuests did not compete for power or safety, and the nominations process was not discussed by the HouseGuests.

Every two weeks, each HouseGuest participated in a mandatory voting called Nomination which decide a list of HouseGuests nominated for eviction, also known as "Marked for banishment". Each HouseGuest secretly nominated two other fellow housemates, providing full reasons for their nominations. In the event of a tie, the two or more HouseGuests with the most nominations became marked for banishment and faced the public vote for the following week. Towards the end of the season, the nominations process reverted to a weekly process.

After the nominations were finalized, a public voting window opens for America who vote for which HouseGuest would be banished through televoting. This process continued until three HouseGuests remained, where the final vote was changed to determine the winner of the show. The winner won the $500,000 prize, the runner-up left with $100,000  and 3rd place left with $50,000.
The competition however, received negative reception from both critics and viewers.

Season 2–present

Having spent millions on the series, CBS issued a second season of the series and announced that various changes would occur with the current format, putting more emphasis on competition and strategy that bears resemblance to the format from another CBS show, Survivor.

At the start of each week in the house, the HouseGuests compete for three types of competitions, Head of Household, Have-Not, and the Power of Veto. For the Head of Household, HouseGuests compete for immunity from eviction and the power to nominate two HouseGuests for the eviction, and often receive privileges such as their own personal bedroom and free laundry service; however, the incumbent Head of Household is not able to compete in the following week's Head of Household competition, meaning that a HouseGuest cannot hold the title for a second consecutive week, except for the final week or other stated circumstances. Introduced in season three is the Power of Veto, where any HouseGuests compete for the right to replace any nominated HouseGuest from the eviction, which continues until three HouseGuests remain. Introduced in season seven are Have-Not competitions, where losing HouseGuests are penalized with a "Have-Not" diet by eating slop and sleep in a special bedroom for the remainder of the week.

At the end of the week, all HouseGuests except for three (the Head of Household and the two nominees) cast a vote, one-by-one, privately inside the "Diary Room" (also called Confession room in other shows), to determine which of the two nominees should be evicted; the HouseGuest receiving a majority of the eligible HouseGuest's votes is evicted during a live episode; if there is a tie in the voting, the reigning Head of Household then casts the deciding vote to resolve a tie. Unlike other versions of Big Brother, the HouseGuests may discuss the nomination and eviction process openly and freely. Once the HouseGuest is evicted, Chen informs the evictee to pack their belongings in a minute and bid farewell messages to any remaining HouseGuests before leaving the house.

Some eviction ceremonies have at least one week with a different variant which was first seen since season five. A notable variant, dubbed the "Double Eviction Week" or "Fast Forward Week", had weeklong events (HoH and Veto Competitions, as well as Nominations, Veto and Eviction cermoneies) occur in an accelerated format, so that two HouseGuests are evicted over a week. The "Double Eviction Week" has become a staple of the show, particularly in the penultimate week featuring the Final 5 and Final 4 evictions. Another variation of the Double Eviction was introduced in season seven with the "Double Eviction Night" where the events of the week occur over the course of the Live Eviction episode, with the event also becoming a staple of the show. The 22nd season, introduced the "Triple Eviction Night", where two weeks worth of game events are played within an extended Live Eviction episode so that three HouseGuests are evicted. The "Triple Eviction Night" was previously used on Big Brother Canada with a different format - where a single live round was played, with three Nominees and Two HouseGuests being evicted within a single round. Another variant is "Eviction Competition" (such as season 14 and season 18) and HouseGuests competed in a series of competitions for survival in the house, and the HouseGuest who finished last may face automatic eviction; if the competition is played as a team, all the members from the losing team are eligible for eviction as if they are nominated. An Eviction Competition was also proposed as a twist in the premiere of season 19, but was not held as the majority opted for an eviction vote instead of a competition.

About halfway through the game, the evicted HouseGuests become members of the Big Brother Jury, which play a role to vote for the winner of the series between the final two HouseGuests. The members of the Jury are not shown any Diary Room interviews or any footage that may include strategy or details regarding nominations. In seasons 2 and 3, all HouseGuests who were evicted except those who either walked or removed from the game are not eligible, but due to a possibility of a tie and an American public vote is decisive, the jury is only eligible for only the seven recently evicted HouseGuests beginning season four (known as Jury of Seven), before increasing to nine members (Jury of Nine) starting season 15. Once only two HouseGuests remain, the members of the Jury would cast the votes to decide the winner by placing their keys with the name to the slots (versus stating their choice to eliminate, as in all other votes). Members who either walked or removed but was part of the Jury remained as a member but is not allowed to vote, instead the vote is decided by the public, as it was first seen in season 11 where Chima Simone was removed from the game while she was still part of the jury and host Chen Moonves represented her vote in her behalf.

To keep the series intriguing, each season typically features a new twist to change the format of the game. This began with season three and the famous "Expect the Unexpected" twist. Other seasons feature smaller twists that have a smaller impact on the game, usually affecting that sole week. The most notable example of this is Pandora's Box, a twist that originated in season 11. The twist sees the current Head of Household for that week being tempted by the box, and can choose to either open the box or leave it. Should a HouseGuest choose to open Pandora's Box, both good and bad consequences could be unleashed into the house, which impacts every HouseGuests in-game including the person who opens it. Similar formats are applied in later seasons, for example, the Den of Temptation introduced in season 19. Other variants such as the Coup d'État, allowed the holder to remove one or both nominees from the block on eviction night, as well as choose who is nominated in their place. A different variant, dubbed Diamond Power of Veto, was seen during Big Brother 12 (2010), which allowed the user to remove one HouseGuest from the block and choose the replacement nominee. Season 14 also had a Diamond Power of Veto which carried the same functionality as a standard PoV. In some seasons, such as season eight, season 10 and season 16, the public voted for a set of HouseGuests who would work with the public. On each pre-determined periods throughout the entire season, the public voted for one of usually two possible actions the HouseGuests would want to perform, and HouseGuests would earn prize money if they were able to complete the action.

Many seasons have featured twists in which evicted HouseGuests (except for HouseGuests who either walked or was removed) can win reentry into the house, either by public vote or competition. Normally, this involves sequestering each eliminated contestant individually or in the jury house (depending on whether the twist occurred pre-jury or post-jury, respectively).

America's Favorite HouseGuest
Introduced in season seven, viewers of Big Brother cast a vote to decide the fan favorite HouseGuest for a cash award of $25,000 on every season except Over-The-Top. The results are announced following the finale of the respective season.

During the season's debut, the award is only eligible to the Jury of Seven (hence the award was called America's Favorite Juror or America's Choice Jury Prize), before expanding the eligibility to all HouseGuests including the winner (excluding any HouseGuests who either withdrew or was forcibly removed from the House) beginning season 11. The voting percentages were also revealed live but it has been dropped since season 17.

Broadcast

Since its launch in the United States, Big Brother has aired on CBS. The show is simulcast in Canada on Global. The fourth and ninth seasons have both aired in the United Kingdom, the latter airing in the Spring season. The first season featured a total of six episodes per week, though all future installments would air three nights per week. Of these three episodes, the weekly eviction episode is the only one that is live; this is the only episode to feature host Julie Chen. This show generally airs on Thursdays. To date, there have been a total of 820 episodes of the series to air. With the exception of the ninth season, the series typically airs once a year during the summer season. The first 15 seasons aired in standard definition, with the 16th season being the first to be produced in HD. However, the live internet feeds would not broadcast in HD until Big Brother 17. Before the series made the transfer, it was the last remaining regularly scheduled prime-time series to remain in standard definition. CBS released the entire third season as a nine-disc set on Region 1 DVD. This made it the first season to receive an official release, and has since become a rare item to find. The fourth season saw the release of a two-disc highlights DVD, featuring previously unseen footage deemed too racy for the main broadcast. To date, these are the only seasons to see a physical release. Beginning with the seventh season, all future seasons are available for purchase on digital retail sites. With the 15th season, TVGN (now Pop) began airing re-runs of the series at later dates, making it the first season to be aired following its premiere; this continued with the 16th season. Subscribers to CBS All Access are able to stream the complete run of Big Brother—including the differently-formatted first season—and an episode of Big Brother 2 that did not air in most markets due to ongoing coverage of the September 11 attacks. CBS aired the spin-off series Celebrity Big Brother from February 7–25, 2018. It was the first spin-off to air on the broadcast network and the second season overall to air in the winter television season (the other being season 9). The celebrity edition aired in a concentrated run with fewer episodes, but with multiple episodes each week.

Live Internet feeds
One of the main aspects of the series is the live feeds, in which viewers can view inside the house at any time. The live feeds have been a part of the series since its inception, initially being offered as a free service during the first season. From the second season onward, a subscription to the live feeds has been required, with the price ranging each year. The first season's feeds were available on the show's official site, hosted by AOL. From the second season to the 14th season, the feeds were available through RealNetworks either as a subscription or as a free addition for Gold members.

Since 2016, the live feeds have aired on CBS All Access (known as Paramount+ since March 2021), again requiring a subscription from users. Though advertised as being available at any time, the feeds are shut off during the weekly nomination ceremony, Power of Veto ceremony, and the competitions and evictions for that week; this is to provide suspense for the series. Slanderous statements and singing of copyrighted music are also blocked for legal reasons.

Competitions

Head of Household (HOH)
The Head of Household competition is held at the beginning of each week and is most often occurred during the live eviction episode. Most often, the first Head of Household competition will require HouseGuests to participate either in pairs or in teams. While the fourth, fifth and eighth seasons had the HouseGuests competing in pairs, seasons 6, 7, 11, 12, 14, 15 and 16 all saw HouseGuests participated as group. The live Head of Household competitions are typically quiz-based, and will see HouseGuests eliminated in each round. Competitions such as "Majority Rules" have been used numerous times, with the game being played in the fourth, fifth, sixth, eighth, 10th and 12th seasons; a variation of the competition was used in the seventh season. Some competitions will attempt to cause drama in the house, such as the "En Garde" Head of Household competition, in which the winner of each round selected the next two to face off against one another. This competition was later used in the 10th through 16th seasons. Various competitions throughout the season will be endurance, requiring HouseGuests to be the last one remaining in the competition. Endurance competitions are often held after game changing announcements, such as when a previously evicted HouseGuest returns. Various endurance competitions may have punished or rewarded contestants who either fall off first or last. Skill-based competitions also appear frequently throughout the season, some of which may last for numerous hours. Skill competitions, such as the 13th season's "Big Brother Open", are finished during the live eviction broadcast. The final Head of Household competition of each season features three rounds; the first is endurance-based, the second is skill-based (often with a memory component), and the final is quiz-based (usually narrated by the Jury members). One of the Head of Household's duties is to nominate two HouseGuests for eviction; in the case of Final three, the Head will instead vote to evict one of the remaining two HouseGuests since these HouseGuests are nominated by default.

Power of Veto (PoV)

The Power of Veto is a power first introduced in Big Brother 3. During its first season, it did not allow a nominated HouseGuest to use it on themselves. The final Power of Veto that season was the Golden Power of Veto and allowed a nominated HouseGuest to remove themselves from the block. Following this, the Golden Power of Veto was used in all subsequent seasons. The Diamond Power of Veto, used in Big Brother 12, allowed one HouseGuest to remove themselves from the block. as well as choose the replacement nominee only moments before the live eviction. Power of Veto competitions differ drastically from the Head of Household competition, with PoV competitions being more skill-based in nature. Competitions such as the "Pop Goes the Veto!" competition, which required HouseGuests to find letter tiles and spell the longest word, have been used in numerous consecutive seasons. Competitions such as the "Big Brother Boardwalk" competition see HouseGuests attempting to guess how much of an item there is; this is one of various competitions that do not require HouseGuests to compete in a physical-based competition. The "How Bad Do You Want It?" Power of Veto competition, first introduced in the seventh season, saw HouseGuests taking punishments in exchange for advancing in the competition. Variations of this competition have been used in numerous subsequent seasons.

Food and luxury
Food and luxury competitions have been a part of the series since it first premiered. In early seasons, the losers of the food competition would be placed on a peanut butter and jelly diet and would not be permitted to eat any other foods.

Beginning with Season 7, the losers of the Have-Not competition were required to eat "Big Brother Slop" for food, and sleep in a special "Have-Not" room with cold showers and most discomforts such as hard pillows and beds for a week. Slop has proven to be an issue for some HouseGuests; in both cases on Season 9, hypoglycemic HouseGuest Amanda Hansen fainted and had a seizure after only a few days of being on the slop diet, while HouseGuest Allison Nichols had an allergic reaction to the slop; both women were medically evacuated from the house, though they returned the following morning. In some seasons, a HouseGuest can also win a Never-Not Pass which they would be immune from being a Have-Not for the season's remainder.

Since second All-stars season, subsequent weeks forego "Have-Not" competitions and instead, either the Head-of-Household or the previous recipients of "Have-Nots" decide the next "Have-Nots" for the week, with the exception of a few weeks which reset the process, such as weeks without a "Have-Not" phase or a competition is held. The choice of decide the "Have-Not" can be of any HouseGuests except for the reigning Head of Household or the incumbents, or one team in the case of teams (first seen in Season 23).

HouseGuests can be penalized for not following Have-Not rules, which is usually incorporated with a penalty vote for eviction, or in some cases, an additional day of a Have-Not. A controversy occurred during Season 21 where eventual winner Jackson Michie also broke the rule, but was not issued a penalty due to the obstruction of the camera view behind the shower walls while eating non-slop, resulting in the Have-Not being unseen for the remainder of that season.

The HouseGuests also frequently compete in luxury competitions during their time in the house, with most frequently, the right to watch a film or television show in the house, or a small cash prize. When competitions for films or television shows occur, an actor or actress from the series may enter the house to host the competition or speak with the HouseGuests. Actors such as Jeremy Piven, David Hasselhoff, and Neil Patrick Harris have all entered the house to participate in luxury competitions or rewards.

Battle of the Block
The Battle of the Block was first introduced during season 16 and was reintroduced during the following season's premiere. Instead of the normal singular Head of Household (HOH), two HOHs were named for that week. Each would then nominate a pair of nominees. These two pairs of nominees would compete against each other in a competition. The winning pair would receive immunity and if nominated, the and incumbent HOH that nominated them would be dethroned and losing immunity, allowing the other HOH sole power for the rest of the week. There were eight Battle of the Block competitions in season 16 and five in season 17. Battle of the Block did not return after season 18.

Battle Back
The Battle Back Competition allows an evicted HouseGuest to return into the house and play as if they were never actually evicted. While elements of this competition first appeared in Season 15, it was officially introduced in Season 18 and has appeared in subsequent seasons except Seasons 22-24. The losers in each Battle Back faces permanent eviction, and the winner in the final Battle Back competition won re-entry. A variant of a Battle Back also appear in Season 20 where the recent evicted HouseGuest competed in a single challenge (due to a twist) to determine whether the HouseGuest was allowed re-entry if successful.

Another variant also happened on Season 18; dubbed as "Round Trip Ticket", the ticket would allow the HouseGuest who picked it to re-enter the house immediately following eviction (for a certain time); HouseGuests are told not to open the ticket until their eviction, and doing so before the eviction will void the effect.

Series overview

Controversy and criticism
Since its inception, Big Brother has been criticized following reports of "HIB" (Harassment, Intimidation and Bullying), violence in the house, obscene language, breach of integrity, and the physical and mental strain of appearing on the series. Several seasons have also been criticized for racism and discrimination, most notably season 15 and season 21. On September 9, 2018, Chen's husband, Les Moonves, resigned as President of CBS after a second wave of reports of sexual misconduct allegations against him. On September 13, Chen closed out that evening's episode by saying, "From outside the Big Brother house, I'm Julie Chen Moonves. Good night." As Chen had previously never used Moonves professionally, many saw the move as Chen standing in solidarity with her husband. Following her resignation from The Talk on September 18 after eight years as co-host, there was speculation on whether Chen would continue as host of Big Brother. Chen did return to host the following year, and has become increasingly spiritual and religious on and off the program in the wake of such revelations.

See also
 The Glass House
 Opposite Worlds
 Love Island (American TV series)

Footnotes

References

External links
 
 

 
2000 American television series debuts
2000s American reality television series
2010s American reality television series
2020s American reality television series
American television series based on Dutch television series
Reality competition television series
CBS original programming
Television series by Reveille Productions
Television series by Endemol
Television series by Evolution Film & Tape
Television shows filmed in Los Angeles